4 Satin is an EP by Scottish post-rock group Mogwai, released in 1997 in the UK and the US through Chemikal Underground and Jetset respectively.

Overview
4 Satin is Mogwai's debut EP. It features three tracks, "Superheroes of BMX" (recorded at MCM Studios in Hamilton, Scotland, and produced by Andy Miller), "Now You're Taken" (recorded at Chamber Studio in Edinburgh, Scotland, produced by Jamie Harley, and featuring vocals by Aidan Moffat), and "Stereodee" (also recorded at MCM Studios, but produced by Paul Savage). All three tracks later appeared on the 2000 compilation album, EP+6. A US mispress of 4 Satin was released, where the wrong master tape was used. It features an alternative mix of "Stereodee", and otherwise-unavailable track "Guardians of Space". The track listing on the sleeve was also incorrect, although later pressings were corrected.

Track listing
All songs were written by Mogwai, except "Now You're Taken", lyrics and vocals by Aidan Moffat.
 "Superheroes of BMX" – 8:05
 "Now You're Taken" – 7:00
 "Stereodee" – 13:39

Mispress track listing
 "Guardians Of Space" – 3:34
 "Now You're Taken" – 6:57
 "Superheroes of BMX" – 8:04
 "Stereodee" – 10:33

Personnel
 Stuart Braithwaite – guitar, keyboard, percussion
 Dominic Aitchison – bass guitar, guitar
 Martin Bulloch – drums
 John Cummings – guitar, piano
 Aidan Moffat – vocals on "Now You're Taken"
 Andy Miller – producer on "Superheroes of BMX"
 Jamie Harley – producer on "Now You're Taken"
 Paul Savage – producer on "Stereodee"

Release history
4 Satin was released in the UK and the US in 1997.

Notes

External links
 

1997 debut EPs
Mogwai EPs